Stormont House  (also called Speaker's House) is the headquarters of the Northern Ireland Office, situated in the Stormont Estate in Belfast, Northern Ireland. It was designed by Ralph Knott, although Sir Edwin Lutyens has been credited with some involvement.

It served as the official residence of the Speaker of the House of Commons of Northern Ireland between 1921 and 1972. For part of the time it was actually lived in by a number of Prime Ministers of Northern Ireland in preference to their own official residence, Stormont Castle, which was used primarily as offices.

The Social Security Agency building shares its grounds with Stormont House, however it is separated from the main building by a fence.

The Northern Ireland Office is currently based at Stormont House after relocating from Castle Buildings nearby.

See also 
 Northern Ireland Office
 Hillsborough Castle

References

External links 
 Northern Ireland Office

Official residences in the United Kingdom
Buildings and structures in Belfast
Government buildings in Northern Ireland